Mahima Makwana (born 5 August 1999) is an Indian actress who works in television shows as well as Hindi and Telugu language films. After entering television with Miley Jab Hum Tum and Balika Vadhu as a child artist, Makwana rose to prominence and became a household name through her character Rachna in Zee TV's popular soap opera Sapne Suhane Ladakpan Ke, following which she went on to establish herself as one of the promising TV actresses with lead roles in several other television shows.

In 2021, Makwana made her Hindi film debut in the action thriller film Antim starring Salman Khan and Aayush Sharma in 2021.

Biography
Makwana was born and brought up in Mumbai. Her father was a construction worker who died when she was five months old. Makwana and her elder brother were raised by their mother, a former social worker. Makwana completed her schooling from Mary Immaculate Girls' High School  Makwana has a bachelor's degree in mass media.

Career

Television 
Makwana started auditioning for acting parts at the age of 10, and appeared in a few Television advertisements. Her television debut was Mohe Rang De on Colors TV and she appeared in CID, Aahat, Miley Jab Hum Tum and Jhansi Ki Rani as a child artiste. In 2009 she played the role of young Gudiya/Gauri in the Colors TV show Balika Vadhu.

In 2011, Makwana was cast as the Parallel lead in Imagine TV's Sawaare Sabke Sapne... Preeto. Her first major lead role was in the Zee TV blockbuster soap opera Sapne Suhane Ladakpan Ke. Mahima said in an interview that reaching this point in her career was not easy and that she had participated in more than 500 auditions prior to Sapne Suhane Ladakpan Ke.

After Sapne Suhane Ladakpan Ke, In March 2015, Makawana played the role of Ram Kapoor and Gurdeep Kohli daughter in Dil Ki Baatein Dil Hi Jaane. After the end of Dil Ki Baatein Dil Hi Jaane in August, In November 2015, Makwana signed Adhuri Kahaani Hamari where she played the lead recreational role of Manasvini Choudhry/Radhika Khosla.

In 2015, Makwana appeared in an episodic role in Zing's youth show Pyaar Tune Kya Kiya as Mandira opposite Nikhil Chaddha.

In August 2017, Makwana played the lead Anami Baldev Singh  in the Star Plus show Rishton Ka Chakravyuh.

In October 2018, Makwana entered as the female lead role of Mariam in Star Plus show Mariam Khan - Reporting Live post leap replacing Deshna Dugad. From December 2019 to November 2020, Makwana appeared as a protagonist Rani Dave Reshammiya in Colors TV's Shubharambh.

Films 
In 2017, Makwana made her film debut with Telugu Movie Venkatapuram.

In September 2019, Makwana appeared as Natasha in the short film titled Take 2. Take 2 was officially selected and premiered at the 10th Jagran Film Festival 2019, 10th Zumba film festival, and Asian Film Festival, Los Angeles, Hollywood. Take 2 won 'BEST FOREIGN FILM' at the Real-time film festival, Nigeria, 2020 and 'best festival themed film'.

In 2019, Makwana made her digital debut with Rangbaaz Season 2 as Chiku. In 2020, Makwana appeared in a web show Flesh as Zoya.

In March 2021, Makwana was seen in a Tollywood-Hollywood flick Mosagallu which stars Kajal Agarwal, Vishnu Manchu and Suniel Shetty.

In December 2020, Makwana was cast as the female lead in the movie Antim: The Final Truth opposite Aayush Sharma. Antim: The Final Truth was realised on 26 November 2021 and received mixed to positive reviews from critics. Bollywood Hungama wrote that she, "makes a confident debut and is memorable in the scene where she blasts Aayush."

Filmography

Films 

 All films are in Hindi unless noted.

Television

Web series

Music videos

See also 
 List of Hindi television actresses 
 List of Indian television actresses

References

External links 

1999 births
Living people
Indian television actresses
Indian soap opera actresses
Indian film actresses
Actresses in Telugu cinema
Actresses in Hindi television
21st-century Indian actresses